Hong Kong Fourth Division League was a division of the Hong Kong Football Association in Hong Kong. It was the fourth overall tier of the Hong Kong football league system.

Hong Kong Fourth Division League was originally introduced in 1955 and dissolved in 1956 but was reintroduced in 2012 again as a fourth tier league. It was folded again in 2014 after the establishment of the Hong Kong Premier League.

Past winners
1955–56: Tai Wah
2012–13: Yau Tsim Mong
2013–14: Sai Kung

References

External links

 
5